GAMA202627 (also known as G202627) is a barred spiral galaxy similar to our own Milky Way.

The galaxy was described in a 2012 paper
by astronomer Dr Aaron Robotham, jointly from the University of Western Australia node of the International Centre for Radio Astronomy Research (ICRAR) and the University of St Andrews in Scotland, when he searched for groups of galaxies similar to ours in the most detailed map of the local Universe yet, the Galaxy And Mass Assembly survey (GAMA). The Galaxy and Mass Assembly (GAMA) survey is an international collaboration led from ICRAR and the Australian Astronomical Observatory to map our local Universe in closer detail. The galaxy has a redshift measured at z = 0.051219 +/- 0.000123, which corresponds to a distance of 705 Mly, or 216 Mpc.

Dr Robotham noted, "We found about 3% of galaxies similar to the Milky Way have companion galaxies like the Magellanic Clouds, which is very rare indeed. In total we found 14 galaxy systems that are similar to ours, with two of those being an almost exact match."

The Milky Way is surrounded by its close companions, the Large and Small Magellanic Clouds, which are visible in the southern sky. Many galaxies have smaller galaxies in orbit around them, but few have two that are as large as the Magellanic Clouds. That is why GAMA202627 is so unique as it has two massive satellite galaxies in close proximity.

References

Barred spiral galaxies
165514
Hydra (constellation)